Fisher House Foundation is a charity and foundation that builds comfort homes where military & veterans families can stay free of charge, while a loved one is in the hospital. Fisher Houses are located at major military and VA medical centers nationwide, and in Europe, close to the medical center or hospital it serves. Fisher House Foundation ensures that there is never a lodging fee. 

Fisher Houses have between 8 and 21 suites, with private bedrooms and baths. Families share a common kitchen, laundry facilities, a dining room, and a living room.

Since its inception, the program has saved military and veterans’ families an estimated $500+ million in out-of-pocket costs for lodging and transportation.

Currently, Ken Fisher, Zachary’s grand-nephew, continues the legacy and serves as the Chairman and CEO of Fisher House Foundation.

History 
The Fisher House program was founded in 1990, after Pauline Trost, wife of Admiral Carlisle Trost, former Chief of Naval Operations, made Zachary Fisher of Fisher Brothers, aware of the need for housing for military families during hospitalization of a loved one.

The Fishers entered into a “public-private partnership” with the government, who allowed Fisher to build on their land, after which the home was “gifted” back to the military, to operate in perpetuity. He helped ensure that families could have "a home away from home", enabling them to be a part of the healing process.

The organization has also covered death gratuity payments of $100,000 USD to families of soldiers killed in the line of duty during government shut-downs. During the 16-day 2013 government shutdown, they provided $750,000 in grants to 30 families.

Foundation mission statement 
Fisher House Foundation, Inc. is an international, not-for-profit organization established to improve the quality of life for members of the military, veterans, and their families. The Foundation builds comfort homes at military and VA medical centers and gifts them to the government. Other Quality of Life programs include the Hero Miles and Hotels for Heroes programs, ongoing assistance to Fisher Houses, scholarships, support for continuing rehabilitation initiatives, and individual assistance to members of the military and their families during a crisis.

Housing 

In 1991, the first Fisher House was opened, at the National Naval Medical Center (now Walter Reed Military Medical Center) in Bethesda, Maryland. President and Mrs. Bush joined Zachary Fisher, and his wife Elizabeth, to dedicate the house.

Zach and Elizabeth continued to use their own money to build additional homes until his death in 1999. Today, there are over 85 Fisher Houses in operation in the United States and Germany, as well as partnership in the UK with the Queen Elizabeth Hospital Birmingham Charity and Help for Heroes to open accommodation for patients at the Royal Centre for Defence Medicine and their families. Other locations have grown and expanded, from the original square footage, in order to not turn away those in need.

Fisher Houses have up to 21 suites, with private bedrooms and baths.  Families share a common kitchen, laundry facilities, a warm dining room and an inviting living room.  Fisher House Foundation ensures that there is never a lodging fee. The average stay of a family at the centers is nine days, but the longest stay is three years.

Other programs 
Fisher House Foundation also operates the Hero Miles Program, using donated frequent flyer miles to bring family members to the bedside of injured service members as well as the Hotels for Heroes program using donated hotel points to allow family members to stay at hotels near medical centers without charge. The Foundation also manages a grant program that supports other military charities and scholarship funds for military children, spouses, and children of fallen and disabled veterans.

Impact 
According to the organization's website in 2019 the foundation had over 32,000 families stay in Fisher Houses and since 1990 has saved these families over $500 million in travel expenses.

Partnership 
Over the years the Fisher House Foundation has partnered with other foundations, organizations, and companies in order, to raise money, stock the homes, and help those at the homes and military families. Some of those include;

 Newman's Own 
 Suave
 Fuzzy's Vodka
 National Football League Players Association (NFLPA)
 Hope for the Warriors
 Food Lion Feeds
 Smokey Bones Bar & Fire Grill
 Samsung
 Walmart [Operation: Deck the Walls]

Recognition 
In 2018, the foundation was recognized as the top charity for supporting the military, veterans and their families, based on accountability, transparency and financial reports. Charity Navigator, a US charity rating agency, has designated the foundation with a four star rating for 16 straight years in 2019.

See also
Naval Support Activity Bethesda
Ronald McDonald House Charities, a similar charity for civilians

References

External links

Official websites

Medical and health organizations based in Maryland
Non-profit organizations based in Maryland
Organizations established in 1990